CEE Property Development Portfolio B.V. (CPDP) is a closed-end real estate investment fund registered in the 
Netherlands. It is part of consolidated financial statements of Erste Group's subsidiary Česká spořitelna. In October 2015 Česká spořitelna announced it intends to liquidate the fund.

Since its launch in September 2004 its assets are managed by company CEE Asset Management (CEE AM). CEE AM used to be a subsidiary of real estate development company Sekyra Group managed by Luděk Sekyra, since April 2008 it was owned by Jersey-based CEE ASSET MANAGEMENT LIMITED.

After its incorporation CPDP purchased company Roztyly Centrum, owner of administrative building leased by T-Mobile Czech Republic, and company Gallery MYŠÁK owning a real estate in downtown of Prague.  In August 2006 the fund founded a subsidiary CPDP Jungmannova, which in turn acquired from Sekyra Group company Mrázovka II, owning administrative building Golden Cross on Jungmann square in Prague. In April 2007 CPDP acquired 20% stake in project Central Park Praha. In February 2009 the fund subscribed newly issued shares of company CPP Lux and as a result increased its share in project Central Park Praha to 99,9%.

In December 2009 Česká spořitelna recognised a provision of CZK 1.8 billion against its ownership interest in CPDP. In August 2010 daily E15 reported about attempt of CPDP to sell companies from its real estate portfolio.

References 

Real estate companies of the Netherlands
Defunct companies of the Netherlands
Dutch companies established in 2004